Benton Township is a township in Linn County, in the U.S. state of Missouri.

Benton Township was established in 1838, and most likely was named after Thomas Hart Benton, a U.S. Senator from Missouri.

References

Townships in Missouri
Townships in Linn County, Missouri